The 1938 Ukrainian Cup was a football knockout competition conducting by the Football Federation of the Ukrainian SSR and was known as the Ukrainian Cup.

On 11 April 1938 newspaper "Radianskyi sport" (Soviet Sport) informed that sports inspection of the government committee in physical culture and sports reviewed and adopted regulation of the "URSR Cup" (Ukrainian Cup) competition of football, which at the same time is a regional competition of the 1938 "USSR Cup" (Soviet Cup).

Teams 
 Avanhard Druzhkivka
 Avanhard Horlivka
 Avanhard Kharkiv
 Avanhard Kramatorsk
 Avanhard Stalino
 Avanhard Sumy
 Avtomotor Kharkiv
 Azot Nova Horlivka
 Azot Shostka
 Blyskavka Kharkiv
 Budivelnyk Dniprodzerzhynsk
 Budivelnyk Kryvyi Rih
 Burevisnyk Krasnyi Luch
 Burevisnyk Kryvyi Rih
 Burevisnyk Stalino
 DKA Korosten
 Dynamo Dnipropetrovsk
 Dynamo Kharkiv
 Dynamo Kyiv
 Dynamo Mohyliv-Podilskyi
 Dynamo Mykolaiv
 Dynamo Odesa
 Dynamo Poltava
 Dynamo Vinnytsia
 Dynamo Zhytomyr
 Dynamo-2 Kyiv
 Dzerzhynets Kremenchuk
 Dzerzhynets Voroshylovhrad
 Kanatnyi zavod Kharkiv
 Kharchovyk Kherson
 Kharchovyk Odesa
 Koksokhimichnyi zavod Makiivka
 Kolyormet Zaporizhia
 Kryla Rad Berdyansk
 Kryla Rad Zaporizhia
 Lokomotyv Dnipropetrovsk
 Lokomotyv Kharkiv
 Lokomotyv Konotop
 Lokomotyv Kotovsk
 Lokomotyv Kyiv
 Lokomotyv Lozova
 Lokomotyv Odesa
 Lokomotyv Poltava
 Lokomotyv Sloviansk
 Lokomotyv Synelnykove
 Lokomotyv Voznesensk
 Lokomotyv Yasynuvata
 Lokomotyv Zaporizhia
 Lokomotyv-2 Kyiv
 Metalist Kharkiv
 Rot-Front Kyiv
 Rot-Front Poltava
 Ruda Kryvyi Rih
 Shakhta No.30 Rutchenkove
 Shakhtar Stalino
 Silmash Kharkiv
 Silmash Kirovo
 Silmash Zaporizhia
 Silmash-2 Kharkiv
 Spartak Chernihiv
 Spartak Dnipropetrovsk
 Spartak Kharkiv
 Spartak Korosten
 Spartak Kyiv
 Spartak Poltava
 Spartak Starobilsk
 Spartak Sumy
 Spartak Tiraspol
 Stakhanovets Chystiakove
 Stakhanovets Horlivka
 Stakhanovets Krasnoarmiysk
 Stakhanovets Krasnyi Luch
 Stakhanovets Lysychansk
 Stakhanovets Ordzhonikidze
 Stakhanovets Sergo
 Stal Dniprodzerzhynsk
 Stal Dnipropetrovsk
 Stal Kostiantynivka
 Stal Kryvyi Rih
 Stal Makiivka
 Stal Stalino
 Stal Voroshylovsk
 Stalinets Kharkiv
 Sudnobudivnyk Mykolaiv
 Tekhnikum FK Dnipropetrovsk
 Tekhnikum FK Kyiv
 Temp Vinnytsia
 Traktor Kharkiv
 Tsukrovyk Sumy
 Tsukrovyky Karlivka
 Vodnyk Kherson
 Vodnyk Kyiv
 Zavod imeni Kominterna Dnipropetrovsk
 Zavod imeni Lenina Krasnohorivka
 Zavod imeni Libknekhta Dnipropetrovsk
 Zdorovya Kharkiv
 Zenit Kharkiv
 Zenit Kyiv
 Zenit Stalino
 Znannia Kherson

Competition schedule

Zonal (regional) stage

Group preliminary round 
The main date for games was on 5 May 1938, replays took place next day on 6 May.

Zonal (regional) quarterfinals 
The main date for games was on 10 May 1938.

Zonal (regional) semifinals 
The main date for games was on 15 May 1938.

Zonal (regional) finals 
The main date for games was on 20 May 1938.

Winners of zonal (regional) stage 
Winners of zonal (regional) stage qualified for the Round of 64 (1/32) of the Soviet Cup as well as Round of 32 (1/16) Ukrainian Cup final stage.
 Group 1 (Kharkiv): Zdorovya Kharkiv, Lokomotyv Kharkiv
 Group 2 (Kyiv): Lokomotyv-2 Kyiv, Dynamo-2 Kyiv
 Group 3 (Odesa): Dynamo Mykolaiv, Kharchovyk Odesa
 Group 4 (Dnipropetrovsk): Spartak Dnipropetrovsk, Lokomotyv Zaporizhia
 Group 5 (Donbas): Avanhard Kramatorsk, Stal Kostiantynivka

Final stage 
For the Ukrainian Cup final stage qualified 10 winners of the zonal (regional) stage and 6 exhibition teams out of the 1938 Soviet Top League (Dynamo Kyiv, Dynamo Odesa, Shakhtar Stalino, Lokomotyv Kyiv, Silmash Kharkiv, Spartak Kharkiv).

First elimination round

Quarterfinals

Semifinals

Final

Top goalscorers

See also 
 1938 Football Championship of the Ukrainian SSR
 Soviet Cup
 Ukrainian Cup

Notes

References

External links 
 Information source 
 Forgotten tournaments (Забуті турніри). Ukrainian Premier League. 23 May.

1938
Cup
1938 domestic association football cups